Dionysius is the final studio album by drummer Dannie Richmond recorded in Italy in 1983 and released on the Italian Red label.

Reception

AllMusic reviewer Michael G. Nastos stated "An album played by ex-Mingusites, this is one side originals and one side of Charles Mingus's music".

Track listing
 "Flying Colours" (Ricky Ford) – 6:50
 "Dionysius" (Dannie Richmond) – 7:00
 "Hi Jinks" (Jack Walrath) – 4:36
 "Three or Four Shades of Blues" (Charles Mingus) – 9:03
 "Peggy's Blue Skylight" (Mingus) – 10:30

Personnel
Dannie Richmond – drums
Jack Walrath – trumpet, flugelhorn
Ricky Ford – tenor saxophone, soprano saxophone
Bob Neloms – piano
Cameron Brown – bass

References

Red Records albums
Dannie Richmond albums
1983 albums